Chamaemyia paludosa is a species of fly in the family Chamaemyiidae. It is found in Europe and North America.

References

Chamaemyiidae
Muscomorph flies of Europe
Diptera of North America
Taxa named by James Edward Collin
Insects described in 1966